Jessica Leyden (born 22 February 1995) is a British rower.

In 2013, she won single sculls gold at the World Rowing Junior Championships, which made her the first British woman to win a global solo openweight rowing title at any level. At the time, she was a student at Bacup and Rawtenstall Grammar School. She won a bronze medal at the 2017 World Rowing Championships in Sarasota, Florida, as part of the quadruple sculls with Bethany Bryan, Mathilda Hodgkins-Byrne and Holly Nixon.

Leyden has twice won the Wingfield Sculls in 2016 and 2019 and also in 2019 it was announced she would represent Team GB at the 2020 Tokyo Olympic Games.

References

External links

Living people
1995 births
British female rowers
World Rowing Championships medalists for Great Britain
Sportspeople from Sheffield
European Rowing Championships medalists
21st-century British women
20th-century British women